A fully powered cartridge, also called full-power cartridge or full-size cartridge, is an umbrella term describing any rifle cartridge with a caliber greater than , a maximum effective range of at least , and intended for engaging targets (large game animals) beyond . The term generally refers to traditional cartridges used in machine guns and bolt action and semi-automatic service rifles and select fire battle rifles prior to, during, and immediately after the World Wars and the early Cold War era, and was a retronym originally made to differentiate from intermediate cartridges that gained widespread adoption into military service after World War II.

Most modern fully powered cartridges have their origin in the late 19th century and early 20th century with the advent of smokeless powder. Examples include the 6.5×55mm Swedish, 7×57mm Mauser, 7.5×55mm Swiss, 7.5×54mm French, 7.62×51mm NATO, 7.62×54mmR, .30-06 Springfield, .303 British, 7.65×53mm Mauser, 7.7×58mm Arisaka, 7.92×57mm Mauser or 8mm Lebel cartridges. The US military's Next Generation Squad Weapon Program selected the 6.8×51mm Common Cartridge in 2022 for testing in a new carbine, new light machine guns and possibly in converted general-purpose machine guns. This does not guarantee actual widespread future issue of the brass-steel hybrid cased 6.8×51mm Common Cartridge.

Despite the ubiquitous adoption of assault rifles and intermediate cartridges as the standard infantry weapon system, full-powered cartridges are still widely used today in battle rifles, designated marksman rifles (DMRs), sniper rifles, general purpose machine guns (GPMGs), and conventional hunting rifles.

Long-action vs. short-action 
In the first half of the 20th century, the practice of civilian sportsmen experimenting and modifying existing cartridges to suit different ballistic needs, known as "wildcatting", really took off, and the result was the number of newly available cartridges exploded from a couple of dozen to well over one hundred.  Having dozens of different cartridges all with unique dimensions was a headache for rifle manufacturers, and still wanting to reach the widest consumer market possible, they had to find a way to economically produce rifles that could be adapted to accept every chambering on the market.  While barrels could be custom-made affordably, actions required more complex machining and thus expensive to make, so it made sense to produce the action dimensions so 3 or 4 standardized lengths that could reliably use most (if not all) of the cartridges on the market.

Most of today’s long-action cartridges had their cases designed around .30-06's measurements, such as the .270 Winchester, .280 Remington, .35 Whelen, .264 Winchester Magnum, and 7mm Remington Magnum, as well as much newer cartridges like the .26 and .28 Nosler.

The .308 Winchester debuted in 1952 and its militarized version, the 7.62×51mm NATO, was adopted by the U.S. military in 1954 for the new M14 rifle. By the 1960s it had displaced the .30-06 as the popular cartridge in both the hunting fields and in the battlefields. More importantly, while the .30-06 has produced roughly a dozen wildcat cartridges, only the .270 Winchester, and the .25-06 Remington enjoyed widespread commercial support; in contrast, the .308 Winchester served as the parent case for the wildcat .243 Winchester, .260 Remington, 7mm-08 Remington, .338 Federal, and .358 Winchester, all five of which are used by hunters even today.

The success of short-action cartridges led to the original and longer "standard length" cartridges to be retronymously named long-action cartridges.

List of Full power cartridges

Service cartridges
Service cartridges are cartridges the service rifles of armies were or are chambered for.
7.62×51mm NATO of NATO
7.92×57mm Mauser of Germany
7.62×54mmR of Russia
.303 British of Britain and the Commonwealth
7.5×54mm French of France
8×50mmR Lebel of France
7x57mm Mauser of Spain
7.65×53mm Mauser of Turkey and Belgium
.30-40 Krag of the United States
.30-06 Springfield of the United States
7.5×55mm Swiss of Switzerland
6.5×50mmSR Arisaka of Japan
7.7×58mm Arisaka of Japan
8×50mmR Mannlicher of Austria and Hungary
8×56mmR of Austria and Hungary
6.5×52mm Carcano of Italy
7.35×51mm Carcano of Italy
6.5×55mm Swedish of Sweden and Norway
8×58mmR Danish Krag of Denmark
6.5×54mm Mannlicher–Schönauer of Greece
6.5×53mmR of the Netherlands
6.5×58mm Vergueiro of Portugal
.277 Fury (6.8x51mm Sig) of the United States

See also 
 Cartridge (firearms)
 List of rifle cartridges
 List of handgun cartridges
 Intermediate cartridge
 Magnum cartridge

References 

Pistol and rifle cartridges